Black on Broadway is a 2004 HBO stand up comedy special by Lewis Black. In it Black discusses topics such as:  George W. Bush, Bottled water, and the 2004 winter.  He apparently said the word "fuck" 78 times, but was informed that the number was 42: this arose when the Kennedy Center wanted him to do Red White & Screwed there, but required him to tone down his language.

CD Format
Intro - 2:12
Coldest Weather Ever! - 6:09
Jobs - 4:32
Water - 5:47
Milk - 6:21
School Attack - 4:12
Outro - 1:09

Information on the CD
Artist - Lewis Black
Genre - Comedy
Length - 50:40
Released - 2004 (Limited CD)

References

External reviews
Variety.com: Review by Brian Lowry
DVD Verdict: Reviewed by Judge Sandra Dozier

External links
Imdb.com

2000s American television specials
HBO network specials
Stand-up comedy concert films
2004 television specials